Friesthorpe is a settlement and civil parish in the West Lindsey district of Lincolnshire, England. The population of the civil parish (including Snarford and Snelland) at the 2011 census was 204.

Friesthorpe Grade II listed Anglican church is dedicated to St Peter. The church is of 13th-century origin, and was rebuilt in 1841 except for the tower.

References

External links

Hamlets in Lincolnshire
Civil parishes in Lincolnshire
West Lindsey District